Chulhawali is a village in Tundla legislative assembly area in district Firozabad of Uttar Pradesh state in India.
It roughly has the population of about 10,000 and consist of majority of Hindu population dominated by the Jat community. The other dominating castes are brahman and jatav(ravidasiya).The current Pradhan of the village Shankar Singh Solanki is a famous politician of the region and has been serving his second term as the Pradhan.

The village is highly congested with narrow gulleys in its inside making it almost impossible  for tractors or four wheelers to reach the houses that are situated inside. However outer or peripheral area is not congested and tractors can easily get access of those houses.

Girdhari Lal inter college, an old and grand one provides better educational facilities for the people of the village. However trend for English medium education among new generation is driving them toward education facilities situated in Tundla.

The village is well connected by road to nearby town Tundla and also to the National Highway-2. The famous tundla railway station is just 2km far from chulhawali. Agra to Kanpur railway line goes through it hence cutting the village into two part. It is known as the village of lawyers as many residents of this village are in the legal practice.

Villages in Firozabad district